Alan Sheridan (1934 - 2015) was an English author and translator.

Life
Born Alan Mark Sheridan-Smith, Sheridan studied English at St Catharine's College, Cambridge before spending 5 years in Paris as English assistant at Lycée Henri IV and Lycée Condorcet. Returning to London, he briefly worked in publishing before becoming a freelance translator. He translated works of fiction, history, philosophy, literary criticism, biography and psychoanalysis by Jean-Paul Sartre, Jacques Lacan, Michel Foucault, Alain Robbe-Grillet, Robert Pinget and many others. He was the first to publish a book in English on Foucault's work and also wrote a biography of André Gide.

Sheridan occasionally contributed to the London Review of Books in the 1980s.

Works

Translations
(incomplete list)
Robert Pinget, Mahu or the Material, 1966
Raymond Radiguet, The Devil in the Flesh: A Novel, 1968
Philippe Sollers, The Park: A Novel, 1968
Alain Robbe-Grillet, The Immortal One. London: Calder & Boyars, 1971
Georges Balandier, Political Anthropology, 1972
Michel Foucault, The Birth of the Clinic, 1973
Lucien Goldmann, Towards a Sociology of the Novel. New York: Tavistock Publications, 1974
Michel Foucault, Mental Illness and Psychology. New York: Harper and Row, 1976
Michel Foucault, The Archaeology of Knowledge, 1976
Michel Foucault, Discipline and Punish: The Birth of the Prison, 1976
Jean-Paul Sartre, Critique of Dialectical Reason, 1976
Manuel Castells, The Urban Question: A Marxist Approach. London: Edward Arnold, 1977
 Jacques Lacan, The Seminar, Book XI, The Four Fundamental Concepts of Psychoanalysis, London: Hogarth, 1976, reprinted by Harmondsworth: Penguin, 1993.
Jacques Lacan, Écrits: A Selection, 1977
Sébastien Japrisot, One Deadly Summer. New York: Harcourt Brace Jovanovich, 1980. 
Pierre Petitfils, Rimbaud, 1987
Michel Foucault, Politics, Philosophy, Culture: Interviews and Other Writings, 1977-1984, ed. Lawrence D. Kritzmann, 1988
Tahar Ben Jelloun, The Sand Child, 1989
Michel Tournier, Gilles & Jeanne, 1990
Tahar Ben Jelloun, The Sacred Night, 1991
Jean Lacouture, De Gaulle: The Ruler, 1945-1970, 1991. 
Agota Kristof, The Notebook, 1989
Abdelwahab Bouhdiba, Sexuality in Islam, 1998

Novels
Vacation, 1972
Time and Place, 2003

Other
 Michel Foucault: The Will to Truth (1980)
 André Gide: A Life in the Present (Cambridge, Massachusetts: Harvard University Press, 1999)

References

External links
Personal website

1934 births
Alumni of St Catharine's College, Cambridge
French–English translators
Translators of philosophy
Translators of Jacques Lacan
2015 deaths